Veikko Vainio (born April 1, 1948) is a retired Finnish professional basketball player. At 6'9" (2.06 m) tall, he played at the center position. He earned All-Tournament Team honors at EuroBasket 1967.

College career
Vainio played college basketball at Brigham Young University (BYU), with the Cougars.

Playing career

Club career
In his club career, Vainio won one Finnish League championship, in 1967, while playing with KTP.

Finnish national team
Vainio was a regular member of the senior Finnish national team, with whom he played in 68 games. He helped lead Finland to a sixth-place finish at the EuroBasket 1967, averaging 7.1 points per game. He was selected to the All-Tournament Team.

External links
 FIBA.com Profile
 FIBA Europe Profile

1948 births
Living people
BYU Cougars men's basketball players
Centers (basketball)
Finnish expatriate basketball people in the United States
Finnish men's basketball players
KTP-Basket players
People from Kotka
Sportspeople from Kymenlaakso